The NWA Shockwave Heavyweight Championship was a professional wrestling heavyweight championship in NWA Shockwave (NWA-SW) and the National Wrestling Alliance (NWA). It was the original title of the CyberSpace Wrestling Federation promotion and was later recognized by the NWA as a regional title. It was introduced as the CSWF Heavyweight Championship on October 19, 2002. It was established as an NWA heavyweight championship in 2005 following the promotion's admission into the NWA. The promotion became NWA: Cyberspace, and later NWA Shockwave, with the title remaining active until the promotion's close in 2007.

The inaugural champion was Smokey M, who defeated Danny Doring, Kid USA and Sinister X in a four way match on October 19, 2002 to become the first CSWF Heavyweight Champion. There were 10 officially recognized champions, however none held the belt more than once. At 309 days, Slyk Wagner Brown was the longest reigning champion in the title's history. Many then current wrestlers from Total Non-Stop Action held the title during its 5-year history including Ron Killings, Chris Harris, Abyss, Bobby Roode and NWA-TNA World Heavyweight Champion Jeff Jarrett.

Reigns

See also
List of National Wrestling Alliance championships

References

External links
NWA Shockwave on Myspace
NWA Cyberspace on Myspace
CSWF.com
CSWOL.com

NWA Shockwave championships
Heavyweight wrestling championships
National Wrestling Alliance championships
2002 establishments in New Jersey